François de Bourbon (1542 – 4 June 1592) was the Duke of Montpensier and member of the House of Bourbon. He was the brother of Charlotte de Bourbon, Princess of Orange and wife of William the Silent, Prince of Orange. He was the great grandfather of La Grande Mademoiselle cousin of Louis XIV.

Biography

François was born in 1542 to Louis de Bourbon, Duke of Montpensier, and his wife Jacqueline de Longwy. From birth he was known as the Dauphin of Auvergne until his father's death in 1582 when he inherited his father's titles and estates. From then on he was styled the Duke of Montpensier; he also inherited the title Prince of the Dombes as well as the Lordship of Châtellerault and Viscounty of Brosse.

As a teenager, he actively took part in the war against the Huguenots. He also organised the prize of Saint-Jean-d'Angély in 1569 and fought against Protestants at Saintonge. In 1574, he was named Governor of Languedoc and the Dauphiné by Henry III of France. A zealous Roman Catholic, he stayed close to Henry III and didn't join the Holy League. At the death of Henry III, François allied himself with Henry IV of France, his own cousin, who took the French throne in 1589. 

He died some time after he was created Governor of Normandy. He was succeeded by his son Henri de Bourbon.

Family life

In 1566 he married Renée d'Anjou (1550-1597), only surviving daughter of Nicolas d'Anjou-Mézières and Gabrielle de Mareuil. Renée was a great-great-great-granddaughter of Louis II of Naples. François and Renée had one son:

Henri de Bourbon, Duke of Montpensier (12 May 1573 – 27 February 1608) married Henriette Catherine de Joyeuse and had issue:
Marie de Bourbon, Duchess of Montpensier (15 October 1605 – 4 June 1627) married Gaston d'Orléans and had issue:
Anne Marie Louise d'Orléans, Duchess of Montpensier, La Grande Mademoiselle (29 May 1627 – 3 April 1693) died unmarried.

Ancestry
{{ahnentafel
|collapsed=yes |align=center
|boxstyle_1=background-color: #fcc;
|boxstyle_2=background-color: #fb9;
|boxstyle_3=background-color: #ffc;
|boxstyle_4=background-color: #bfc;
|boxstyle_5=background-color: #9fe;
|1= 1. François de Bourbon
|2= 2. Louis de Bourbon, Duke of Montpensier
|3= 3. Jacqueline de Longwy
|4= 4. Louis de Bourbon, Prince of La Roche-sur-Yon
|5= 5. Louise de Bourbon, Duchess of Montpensier
|6= 6. Jean de Longwy
|7= 7. [[Jeanne of Angoulême|Jeanne d'Angoulême, Légitimée d'Angoulême]]
|8= 8. Jean de Bourbon, Count of Vendôme
|9= 9. Isabelle de Beauvau
|10= 10. Gilbert de Bourbon, Count of Montpensier
|11= 11. Clara Gonzaga
|12= 12. Philippe de Longvy, Lord of Givry  
|13= 13. Jeanne de Bauffremont,
|14= 14. Charles d'Orléans, Count of Angoulême
|15= 15. Antoinette de Polignac
|16= 16. Louis de Bourbon, Count of Vendôme
|17= 17. Jeanne de Laval
|18= 18. Louis de Beauvau, Seneschal of Anjou
|19= 19. Marguerite de Chambley
|20= 20. Louis de Bourbon, Count of Montpensier
|21= 21. Jeanne d'Auvergne
|22= 22. Federico Gonzaga, Marquess of Mantua
|23= 23. Duchess Margaret of Bavaria
|24= 24. Jean de Longvy, Lord of Givry  
|25= 25. Jeanne de Vienne
|26= 26. Pierre de Bauffremont, Count of Charny 
|27= 27. Marie de BourgogneIllegitimate daughter of Philip the Good
|28= 28. John, Count of Angoulême
|29= 29. Marguerite de Rohan
|30= 30. Foucaud de Polignac
|31= 31. Agnès de Chabanais
}}

Sources

 Charles Gavard: Galeries historiques du Palais de Versailles. Band 9. Imprimerie royale, Paris 1848, S. 79–80 (PDF; 9,8 MB).
 Ferdinand La Roche Lacarelle: Histoire du Beaujolais et des sires de Beaujeu, suivie de l’armorial de la province. Band 1. L. Perrin, Lyon 1853, S. 269–271 (PDF; 7 MB).
 Jean Vatout: Catalogue historique et descriptif des tableaux appartenans à s.a.s.mgr. le duc d’Orléans. Band 1. Gauttier-Laguionie, Paris 1823, S. 318–320 (PDF; 10,1 MB).
Nicolas Viton de Saint-Allais: L’art de vérifier les dates des faits historiques, des chartes, des chroniques, et autres anciens monuments, depuis la naissance de notre-seigneur.'' Band 10. Vallade, Paris 1818, S. 174 (PDF; 30 MB).

1542 births
1592 deaths
House of Bourbon (France)
Dukes of Montpensier
16th-century peers of France
Princes of the Dombes